The men's team competition at the 2006 World Team Judo Championships was held on 17 September at the Bercy in Paris, France.

Results

Repechage

References

External links
 

Mteam
World 2006
World Men's Team Judo Championships